Brades Village is an area of Oldbury, West Midlands, England. Population details as taken at the 2011 census can be found under the Tividale ward of Sandwell.

Areas of the West Midlands (county)
Oldbury, West Midlands